Andrew Jankowiak (born March 10, 1988) is an American racing driver who competes part-time in the ARCA Menards Series, driving the No. 73 Toyota Camry for KLAS Motorsports. He has also previously competed in the NASCAR Whelen Modified Tour.

Personal life
Jankowiak's father Tony Jankowiak married Debby Druar after working along side her on Tommy Druar's pit crew. Jankowiak's mother, father and uncle, Debby Druar Jankowiak, Tony Jankowiak and Tommy Druar, were also racing drivers. Debby Druar Jankowiak was the first female to win a race at the Lancaster Motorplex. Tommy Druar was killed in a Summer 1989 race at Lancaster Motorplex, while the elder Jankowiak was killed in a crash at Stafford Motor Speedway in April 1990. Jankowiak frequently races the number 73 in tribute to his father and uncle. In the 2022 ARCA Menards Series race at Bristol Motor Speedway, Jankowiak raced a special paint scheme inspired by the design his mother used to race.

To fund his racing career, Jankowiak used tips from his job as a delivery driver for Bob & John's La Hacienda.

At a young age, Jankowiak would frequently visit the Ransomville Speedway go-kart track with his mother Debby, and her brother-in-law, Jake.

Racing career

NASCAR Modified Tour

2019

Jankowiak began to compete in the Modified Tour in 2019, driving for Susanne Lewis Racing. He intended to make his debut at the Musket 250 at New Hampshire Motor Speedway, in the #41 Chevrolet, but he withdrew.

He returned at the season-finale, the Sunoco World Series 150 at Thompson Speedway Motorsports Park, in the #55 Airport Collision Dodge. Jankowiak started 30th out of 40 cars and was collected in a major crash on lap 13, which started when Kyle Bensignore spun in turn three and blocked the track, causing him to finish 38th.

2020

For 2020, Jankowiak initially entered the Laurel Highlands 150 at Jennerstown Speedway Complex in the #59 BNP Machine Dodge for Steve Mendoza Racing, but withdrew.

He then competed at the Thompson 150 at Thompson, driving the #59 Jankowiak Racing Chevrolet. Jankowiak qualified in 28th (last) place and finished 24th, due to handling issues after 116 of 154 laps.

Jankowiak's third entry was the season-finale, the World Series of Speedway Racing 150 at Thompson, driving for Mendoza again, but in a Chevrolet. He started 17th, but finished 24th out of 27 cars, retiring due to handling issues after 75 of 150 laps.

2021

In 2021, Jankowiak drove in the Nu-Way Auto Parts 150 at New York International Raceway Park, driving the #59 BNP Machine Chevrolet for Jody Lauzon Racing, starting 17th and finishing in 14th place (two laps down).

ARCA

2021

Jankowiak began to compete in ARCA in 2021, driving the #73 entry for his own Jankowiak Motorsports part-time. He purchased a car from Ken Schrader Racing to use.

In the week leading up to the season-opening Lucas Oil 200 at Daytona International Speedway, Jankowiak received sponsorship from OneRail. For the race, Jankowiak qualified in 11th place out of 34 cars and would finish on the lead lap in eighth.

He then competed at the General Tire 200 at Talladega Superspeedway, with sponsorship from V1 Fiber and Thermal Foams. Jankowiak started 27th and would improve his finish to seventh, once again on the lead lap.

At the General Tire 150 at Charlotte Motor Speedway, Jankowiak honored, on his car and helmet, members of the United States Armed Forces from western New York that had been killed in action. With sponsorship from V1 again, he started eighth out of 23 cars and would finish in ninth place, on the lead lap.

Prior to the General Tire #AnywhereIsPossible 200 at Pocono Raceway, Jankowiak received sponsorship from Konnect General Stores through their Phillips 66 distribution. In the field of 24 cars, he started in ninth place and would equal his Talladega finish by finishing seventh, Jankowiak's fourth top 10 and lead lap finish of the season.

Jankowiak started his first non-superspeedway oval race when he competed at the road course Watkins Glen International for the Clean Harbors 100 at The Glen. For the race, Marsh Racing collaborated in the fielding of the entry, with continued sponsorship from Konnect via their corporate sibling Dak's Market and Phillips 66. The same car from the oval races was converted to a road course set-up. On his first lap of the combined practice and qualifying session, the rear end on Jankowiak's car blew, causing his team to spend most of the session repairing his car, resulting in them qualifying 27th in the 28 car field. He would finish the race in 16th place, albeit two laps down.

On January 19, 2023, it was announced that Jankowiak would return to run part-time in the main ARCA Series in 2023, continuing to drive the No. 73 car, but the ownership of his race team would be taken over by fellow driver Andy Seuss as well as Kevin Lapierre, allowing Jankowiak to focus on the driver role. The team was renamed KLAS Motorsports (the initials of the two new owners).

Motorsports career results

ARCA Menards Series
(key) (Bold – Pole position awarded by qualifying time. Italics – Pole position earned by points standings or practice time. * – Most laps led.)

ARCA Menards Series East

Whelen Modified Tour

References

External links
 
 Official Twitter account
 Official Facebook account

1988 births
Living people
NASCAR drivers
People from New York (state)